, also known as KINYA, is a male singer and actor from Saitama Prefecture, Japan. He sang the theme songs for the anime Tsubasa: Reservoir Chronicle and various songs for Gravitation.

Discography

Albums

Singles

DVDs 
 LIVE physical small club circuit 2001 July 1, 2002 ESBL-9038
 Live physical "ex. - 0126. 2000 to 2002 June 19, 2002 ESBL-9011
 Kinya ga yuku! Daihyakka July 1, 2002 ESBL-9039
 Kinya ga kuru!? Daihyakka July 1, 2002 ESBL-9040

Books 
 "Aka" Kotani Kinya Artist Book 1 October, 2000 
 "Ao" Kotani Kinya Artist Book 2 November, 2000 
 "Kiiro" Kotani Kinya Artist Book 3 January, 2001

References

External links 
  
 

Japanese male pop singers
Living people
Musicians from Saitama Prefecture
1979 births
Japanese male voice actors
21st-century Japanese singers
21st-century Japanese male singers